DVS may refer to:
 D.V.S*, an American electronic music producer/ guitarist named Derek VanScoten
 Developing Virtue Secondary School, Talmage, California, USA

Organizations and companies  
 Descriptive Video Service, a United States producer of video for the visually impaired
 Deutsche Verkehrsfliegerschule, an organization that trained pilots for the Nazi Luftwaffe
 Digital Video Systems, a German digital cinema company
 DVS Records, a Dutch record label
 DVS Shoes
 D.V.S. Senior Honor Society, an honor society at Emory University, Atlanta, USA

Technology and science 
 Digital vinyl system, technology and software for DJs to emulate records through digital music
 Divinyl sulfide, an organic compound
 Distributed vibration sensing, a viber optical sensing
 Dynamic vapor sorption, a physical chemistry method that measures how a sample absorbs a solvent
 Dynamic vision sensor, a neuromorphic digital camera, which responds to local changes in brightness
 Dynamic voltage scaling, a power management technique in computer architecture